Fedot, Федоt  is a masculine Russian form of given name Theodotus which may refer to:

 Fedot Alekseyevich Popov (died between 1648 and 1654), Russian explorer
 Fedot Shubin (1740-1805), Russian sculptor
 Fedot Sychkov (1870-1958), Russian painter
 the title character of the 1985 poem The Tale of Fedot the Strelets

Russian masculine given names